Gogisgi (1927–1997), who also published under his baptismal name of Carroll Arnett, was Deer Clan Chief of the Overhill Band of the Cherokee Nation, and also one of the most prolific Cherokee poets.

Bibliography

 Spells. Blue Creek, OH : Bloody Twin Press, 1995. 
 Night perimeter : new and selected poems 1958-1990. Greenfield Center, NY : Greenfield Review Press, 1991. 
 Engine. Norman, OK : Point Riders Press, 1988. 
 Rounds. Merrick, NY : Cross-Cultural Communications, 1982. 
 American Indian chapbook. Beloit, WI. : Beloit Poetry Journal, 1980. 
 South line : poems. New Rochelle, NY : Elizabeth Press, 1979. 
 Tsalagi : poems. New Rochelle, NY : Elizabeth Press, 1976. 
 Come. New Rochelle, NY : Elizabeth Press, 1973. 
 Earlier. New Rochelle, NY : Elizabeth Press, 1972. 
 Through the woods. New Rochelle, NY : Elizabeth Press, 1971. 
 Like a wall. New Rochelle, NY : Elizabeth Press, 1969. 
 Not only that. New Rochelle, NY : Elizabeth Press, 1967. 
 Then : poems. New Rochelle, NY : Elizabeth Press, 1965.

References

1927 births
Cherokee Nation artists
20th-century American poets
American poets
Native American poets
1997 deaths
20th-century Native Americans